Hampont is a commune in the Moselle department in Grand Est in north-eastern France.

History
SS-Obergruppenführer Theodor Eicke (1892–1943), second commandant of the Dachau concentration camp, was born here in 1892.

The town was formally known by the German name Hudingen between 1871 and 1918 and Hüdingen between 1940 and 1944.

See also
 Communes of the Moselle department
 Parc naturel régional de Lorraine

References

External links
 

Communes of Moselle (department)